The Ansan Line is a railway line connecting Gunpo to Siheung in South Korea. Services on this line run through train services into Seoul Subway Line 4 via the Gwacheon Line.  Services from the Suin Line share tracks with this line between Hanyang Univ. (Ansan)–Oido.

History 
In 1988 the section between Geumjeong–Ansan opened as a branch line of Gyeongbu Line with through train service to Seoul Subway Line 1. Since the opening of the Gwacheon Line the trains have been running through to Seoul Subway Line 4. The line was extended as follows:

Stations 
Express trains stop at stations marked "●" and pass stations marked "|".

See also
 Subways in South Korea
 Seoul Subway Line 4

References 

Seoul Metropolitan Subway lines
Railway lines in South Korea
Railway lines opened in 1988
Transport in Gyeonggi Province